Eulithosia plesioglauca is an owlet moth (family Noctuidae). The species was first described by Harrison Gray Dyar Jr. in 1912.

The MONA or Hodges number for Eulithosia plesioglauca is 9767.

References

Further reading

External links
 

Amphipyrinae
Articles created by Qbugbot
Moths described in 1912